R v Clarkson (David) (1971) 55 Cr. App. Rep. 445 is an English criminal law case, dealing with aiding and abetting and accessorial liability. The court ruled that in order for aiding and abetting to have taken place, there must be evidence of active encouragement of the crime.

The defendant watched as a woman was raped three times, although there was no evidence that he encouraged the action.

Since there is no offence of omission in English law, unless a duty of care is present, the defendant's actions were not indictable, and his appeal was successful.

See also
 R v. Coney (1882)

C
1971 in England
1971 in case law
1971 in British law
Court of Appeal (England and Wales) cases